Plumbago is a genus of 10–20 species of flowering plants in the family Plumbaginaceae, native to warm temperate to tropical regions of the world. Common names include plumbago and leadwort (names which are also shared by the genus Ceratostigma).

Description

The flowers are white, blue, purple, red, or pink, with a tubular corolla with five petal-like lobes; they are produced in racemes.

The flower calyx has glandular trichomes (hairs), which secrete a sticky mucilage that is capable of trapping and killing insects; it is unclear what the purpose of these trichomes is; protection from pollination by way of "crawlers" (ants and other insects that typically do not transfer pollen between individual plants), or possible protocarnivory.

Mature plumbago leaves often have a whitish residue on their undersides, a feature that can confuse gardeners. While this white material resembles a powdery mildew disease or a chemical spray deposit, it is actually a natural exudate from "chalk" glands that are found on the Plumbago species.

Taxonomy
This may have referred to its lead-blue flower colour, the ability of the sap to create lead-colored stains on skin, or Pliny's belief that the plant was a cure for lead poisoning.

The following species are accepted by The Plant List:

Plumbago amplexicaulis Oliv.
Plumbago aphylla Bojer ex Boiss.
Plumbago auriculata Lam.
Plumbago ciliata Engl. ex Wilmot-Dear
Plumbago coerulea Kunth
Plumbago dawei Rolfe
Plumbago europaea L.
Plumbago glandulicaulis Wilmot-Dear
Plumbago indica L.
Plumbago madagascariensis M. Peltier
Plumbago montis-elgonis Bullock
Plumbago pearsonii L. Bolus
Plumbago pulchella Boiss.
Plumbago stenophylla Wilmot-Dear
Plumbago tristis Aiton
Plumbago wissii Friedr.
Plumbago zeylanica L.

See also
 Plumbagin

References

External links

Flora of Chile: Plumbago (pdf file)
Flora of China: Plumbago
Flora of Ecuador: Plumbago
Flora Europaea: Plumbago
Flora of North America: Plumbago
Flora of Pakistan: Plumbago

 
Caryophyllales genera
Carnivorous plants
Plumbaginaceae
Taxa named by Carl Linnaeus